Kettle Hill is a mountain located in the Catskill Mountains of New York northeast of Margaretville. Pakatakan Mountain is located south of Kettle Hill and Cole Hill is located southeast.

References

Mountains of Delaware County, New York
Mountains of New York (state)